Cychrus yunnanus is a species of ground beetle in the subfamily Carabinae that can be found in Sichuan and Yunnan provinces of China. It was described by Fairmaire in 1887.

References

yunnanus
Beetles described in 1887
Endemic fauna of China